Balani is a Sindhi surname. Notable people with the surname include:

 Anant Balani (1962–2003), Indian film director and screenwriter
 Sonia Balani (born 1991), Indian actress and model

See also 
 Balani (disambiguation)

Sindhi-language surnames